Regina Sela Monika Lili'i (born 3 October 1986) is a Samoan cricketer who has played for Samoa, Auckland and Northern Districts. She has also captained the New Zealand Women's Indoor Cricket Team, and was the first Pacific woman to lead the New Zealand side.

In May 2014, she was named as the player of the tournament in the East Asia Pacific Women's Cricket Trophy, and was part of Samoa's gold-winning team in the cricket tournament at the 2015 Pacific Games.

In April 2019, she was named as the captain of Samoa's squad for the 2019 ICC Women's Qualifier EAP tournament, held in Vanuatu. She made her Women's Twenty20 International (WT20I) debut for Samoa against Fiji in the Women's Qualifier EAP tournament on 6 May 2019. She finished as the leading run-scorer in the tournament, with 153 runs in five matches.

References

External links
 
 

1986 births
Living people
Samoan women cricketers
Samoa women Twenty20 International cricketers
Sportspeople from Apia
Auckland Hearts cricketers
Northern Districts women cricketers